is a Japanese voice actor affiliated with 81 Produce.

Voice roles

Anime
Ah! My Goddess The Movie (Ishii)
Avenger (Commissioner, Scholar B)
D.Gray-man (Tapp Dopp)
Duel Masters (Dr. Root)
Geneshaft (Elder Ewers)
Ginga Legend Weed (Chourou, Hook)
Glass Mask (TV 2005) (Kuroiwa (ep.8,10,12))
Heat Guy J (Carlo)
Honey and Clover (Professor A (ep.16), Teacher A (ep.21,24))
Ichigeki Sacchu!! HoiHoi-san (OVA) (Pharmacy owner)
Kaikan Phrase (Director (ep.34-35), office manager (ep.36))
Maburaho (Principal Mori)
Madlax (Brian)
MÄR (Senior)
Naruto (Akame Iwana) 
Naruto the Movie: Ninja Clash in the Land of Snow (Hidero) 
PaRappa the Rapper (Bank Employee (ep.6, 24), Father (ep.16), Security Guard (ep.29))
Petite Princess Yucie (Doctor (ep.24-25), History teacher (ep.5))
Pumpkin Scissors (Grandfather (ep.3))
Puni Puni Poemy (Narrator)
Requiem from the Darkness (Heisuke (ep.11))
Saiyuki Reload (Meichin (ep.8))
Shinobi no Ittoki (Mitsuzō Moriyama)
Sky Girls (Oto)
Starship Operators (Hans Georg Hermann)
Super Robot Wars Original Generation: The Animation (Sean Webley)
Trinity Blood (Narration (ep.1), Government priest (ep.3), Butler (ep.4))
Tsubasa: RESERVoir CHRoNiCLE (Statue (ep.26))
Undefeated Bahamut Chronicle (Zogwa  Sharutosu (ep.4, 8))

Tokusatsu
Bakuryu Sentai Abaranger (Trinoid #17: Shiyohosenkameleon (ep.28))
Ninpuu Sentai Hurricanger (Barrier Ninja Kekkaibo (ep.1))

Drama CDs
Border Line Series (Mitsuya - General Manager)

Dubbing Roles

Live-action
The Butler (2016 BS Japan edition) – James Holloway (Lenny Kravitz)
San Andreas – Dr. Lawrence Hayes (Paul Giamatti)

Animation
Thomas and Friends – Sir Topham Hatt (Season 18-onwards, replacing Rokurō Naya) and Farmer Trotter (Season 13-onwards, succeeding  Naoki Kinoshita)

References

External links

1964 births
81 Produce voice actors
Japanese male voice actors
Living people